The Porsanger Peninsula is a peninsula in Troms og Finnmark county, Norway.  The large peninsula sits between the Altafjorden and the Porsangerfjorden and includes parts of the municipalities of Alta, Hammerfest, Måsøy, Nordkapp, and Porsanger.  Stabbursdalen National Park lies on the southern end of the peninsula.

The landscape of the Porsanger peninsula consists mainly of a treeless plain, a continuation of the Finnmarksvidda plateau to the south. A number of fjords cut into the peninsula, of which the largest are the Repparfjorden, Revsbotn, and  Snefjorden from the west and the Kobbefjorden from the north.  The European route E06 highway runs north through the peninsula.

References

Måsøy
Nordkapp
Porsanger
Hammerfest
Alta, Norway
Peninsulas of Troms og Finnmark